Belone is a genus of needlefish common in brackish and marine waters. It is one of ten genera in the family Belonidae.

Species
Three recognised species are in this genus:
 Belone belone (Linnaeus, 1761) (garfish)
 Belone euxini Günther, 1866
 Belone svetovidovi Collette & Parin, 1970 (short-beaked garfish)

Etymology
Georges Cuvier erected the genus by using the specific name of Linnaeus's Esox belone in tautonymy, the word belone is Greek for a needlefish and is thought to have originally referred to the greater pipefish.

References

External links
 
 

 
Belonidae
Ray-finned fish genera
Taxa named by Georges Cuvier